The manga series Tegami Bachi is written by Hiroyuki Asada, the first ten chapters were published in the now-defunct Monthly Shōnen Jump. A special un-numbered chapter was published as a one-shot in Weekly Shōnen Jump prior to the launch of Jump Square, where Tegami Bachi was then serialized. Twenty tankōbon have been released, the first on January 4, 2007, and the last on January 4, 2016.



Volumes list

References

Tegami Bachi